The 2018–19 Iona Gaels men's basketball team represented Iona College during the 2018–19 NCAA Division I men's basketball season. The Gaels were led by ninth-year head coach Tim Cluess, and played their home games at the Hynes Athletic Center in New Rochelle, New York as members of the Metro Atlantic Athletic Conference. They finished the regular season 17–16 overall, 12–6 in MAAC play to win the regular season championship. As the No. 1 seed in the 2019 MAAC tournament, they defeated No. 9 seed Saint Peter's, No. 5 seed Siena and No. 6 seed Monmouth 81–60, to become champions of the MAAC Tournament for a record fourth consecutive time. They earned the MAAC's automatic bid to the 2019 NCAA tournament, receiving a 16 seed in the Midwest region, and facing No. 1 seed North Carolina in the first round. Iona led 38–33 at the half, while making 10-of-21 3-pointers. But North Carolina opened the second half on a 25–7 run, leading by as many as 20, en route to an 88–73 victory. Iona's 15 made three-point field goals are the most ever by a North Carolina opponent in its NCAA tournament history of 171 games.

Previous season 
The Gaels finished the 2017–18 season 20–14, 11–7 in MAAC play to finish in fourth place. They defeated Manhattan, Saint Peter's and Fairfield to become champions of the MAAC tournament for the third consecutive time. They earned the MAAC's automatic bid to the NCAA tournament where they lost in the first round to Duke.

Roster

Schedule and results

|-
!colspan=9 style=|Non-conference regular season

|-
!colspan=9 style=|MAAC regular season

|-
!colspan=9 style=|MAAC tournament

|-
!colspan=9 style=|NCAA tournament

References

Iona Gaels men's basketball seasons
Iona
Iona basketball
Iona basketball
Iona